The January Cup is a Group 3 Thoroughbred handicap horse race which takes place annually in January in Hong Kong, run over a distance of 1800 metres. Horses rated 90 and above are qualified to enter this race.

Winners since 2012

See also
 List of Hong Kong horse races

References
Racing Post:

 The Hong Kong Jockey Club – Racing results of January Cup (2011/12)
 Racing Information of January Cup (2011/12)
 The Hong Kong Jockey Club 

Horse races in Hong Kong
January sporting events